Ulrich von Winterstetten ( 1241–1280) was a German nobleman, priest and Minnesänger (lyric poet).

Life
Ulrich belonged to the Tanne–Waldburg family of imperial ministeriales (unfree nobility) in the Duchy of Swabia. His father was Conrad of Schmalegg and his mother Irmingard, daughter of Conrad of Winterstetten. His grandfather was a patron of Rudolf von Ems and Ulrich von Türheim. He had three older and three younger brothers and four sisters.

Ulrich inherited the title of Schenk (cupbearer). On account his family connections, he was a prominent and influential individual in Swabia. He appears in documents between 1241 and 1280. The first document to mention him is one in which his grandfather arranges a sale of property to Weissenau Abbey. His career as a poet is usually dated earlier, before he became a canon (priest) of Augsburg Cathedral. He died after 1280.

Poetry
Since his grandfather was a guardian of the young king Henry (VII), Ulrich is often grouped with the other Minnesänger associated with Henry's court, Burkhart von Hohenfels and Gottfried von Neifen. The three have been called "a new Swabian school" of Minnesang, although they belonged to different generations. They were influenced by the satirical poems of Neidhart.

Ulrich composed five Leiche (lays) and forty Lieder, including Minnelieder (love songs) and Tagelieder (dawn songs). He is best known for his Tanzleiche (dance songs), which were longer poems with more pronounced rhythm, appropriate for dancing. He is one of the later generation of Minnesänger who experimented with the Leich. He uses refrains more often than any previous Minnesänger. His Tagelieder bear the influence of Wolfram von Eschenbach.

Ulrich is a formalistic poet, known for his "sophisticated rhyme", "technical virtuosity", "rich use of metaphors and images" and preference for "highly conventional thematic" structure. The style of Ulrich and the other late Minnesänger has been called the "flowery style" (geblümter Stil). It is "affected, even mannerist". Even more than his fellow Swabians, however, Ulrich's poetry is "an expression of his artistic skills" that establishes the role of the artist in courtly life.

Ulrich can at times be crass and sexually explicit. He explored the dialogue form, although less so than Gottfried. Examples includes dialogues between a mother and daughter and another between a poet and a lady. Ulrich's 126-line third Leich exemplifies his style and complexity:

Notes

Bibliography

13th-century births
13th-century German poets
German male poets
Minnesingers
Ministeriales